Comfort noise (or comfort tone) is synthetic background noise used in radio and wireless communications to fill the artificial silence in a transmission resulting from voice activity detection or from the audio clarity of modern digital lines.

Some modern telephone systems (such as wireless and VoIP) use voice activity detection (VAD), a form of squelching where low volume levels are ignored by the transmitting device.  In digital audio transmissions, this saves bandwidth of the communications channel by transmitting nothing when the source volume is under a certain threshold, leaving only louder sounds (such as the speaker's voice) to be sent.  However, improvements in background noise reduction technologies can occasionally result in the complete removal of all noise.  Although maximizing call quality is of primary importance, exhaustive removal of noise may not properly simulate the typical behavior of terminals on the PSTN system.

The result of receiving total silence, especially for a prolonged period, has a number of unwanted effects on the listener, including the following:
 the listener may believe that the transmission has been lost, and therefore hang up prematurely.
 the speech may sound "choppy" (see noise gate) and difficult to understand.
 the sudden change in sound level can be jarring to the listener.

To counteract these effects, comfort noise is added, usually on the receiving end in wireless or VoIP systems, to fill in the silent portions of transmissions with artificial noise. The noise generated is at a low but audible volume level, and can vary based on the average volume level of received signals to minimize jarring transitions.

In many VoIP products, users may control how VAD and comfort noise are configured, or disable the feature entirely.

As part of the RTP audio video profile, RFC 3389 defines a standard for distributing comfort noise information in VoIP systems.

A similar concept is that of sidetone, the effect of sound that is picked up by a telephone's mouthpiece and introduced (at low level) into the earpiece of the same handset, acting as feedback.

During the siege of Leningrad, the beat of a metronome was used as comfort noise on the Leningrad radio network, indicating that the network was still functioning.

Many radio stations broadcast birdsong, city-traffic or other atmospheric comfort noise during periods of deliberate silence.  For example, in the UK, silence is observed on  Remembrance Sunday, and London's quiet city ambiance is used. This is to reassure the listener that the station is on-air, but primarily to prevent silence detection systems at transmitters from automatically starting backup tapes of music (designed to be broadcast in the case of transmission link failure).

See also
 Ambient noise
 Talkspurt
 Discontinuous transmission (DTX)
 Presence (sound recording)
 Autonomous sensory meridian response
 Sound masking
 Dead air

References

Gao Research - VAD/CNG
Newton, Harry. Newton's Telecom Dictionary. 20th ed. 2004.

Noise
Radio technology
Voice over IP
Mobile telecommunications